The Leader of the Opposition (officially the Leader of His Majesty's Opposition in Bermuda or Leader of Her Majesty's Opposition in Bermuda when the monarch is female) is the leader of the largest political party in the House of Assembly that is not in government. The Leader of the Opposition is seen as an alternate Premier-in-waiting and leads Bermuda's Opposition and Shadow Cabinet.

The current holder of the post of Leader of the Opposition is The Hon. N. H. Cole Simons, JP, MP

List of leaders of the opposition of Bermuda

References

Leaders of the Opposition
Bermuda